Borodulin or Baradulin is a Russian masculine surname, its feminine counterpart is Borodulina or Baradulina. It may refer to
Artem Borodulin (born 1989), Russian figure skater
Lev Borodulin,  Russian and Israeli photographer
Mikhail Borodulin, Kazakhstani professional ice hockey player
Ryhor Baradulin (1935–2014), Belarusian poet, essayist and translator
Tatiana Borodulina (born 1984), Russian short-track speed skater

See also

Russian-language surnames